Gävle is a city in Sweden, the seat of Gävle Municipality and the capital of Gävleborg County. It had 77,586 inhabitants in 2020, which makes it the 13th most populated city in Sweden. It is the oldest city in the historical Norrland (Sweden's Northern Lands), having received its charter in 1446 from Christopher of Bavaria. However, Gävle is far nearer to the greater Stockholm region than it is to most other major settlements in Norrland and has a much milder climate than associated with said region.

In recent years, the city has received much international attention due to its large Yule Goat figure made of straw - the Gävle Goat. The goat is erected in December each year and is often subsequently vandalized, usually by being set on fire. The goat has now become a symbol for the city and is being used for various marketing purposes.

History

It is believed that the name Gävle derives from the word gavel, meaning river banks in Old Swedish and referring to the Gavleån (Gävle River). The oldest settlement was called Gävle-ägarna, which means "Gavel-owners". This name was shortened to Gävle, then Gefle, and finally Gävle.

Gävle is first mentioned as a town in official history books in 1413 but only received its official town charters in 1446.

For a long time, Gävle consisted solely of small, low, turf or shingle roofed wooden buildings. Boat-houses lined the banks of Gavleån, Lillån, and Islandsån. Until the 18th century the town was built, as was the practice then, around the three most important buildings: the church, the regional palace, and the town hall.

Over the last 300 years, Gävle has been ablaze on three occasions. After the fire of 1776, the town was rebuilt with straight streets and rectangular city blocks. The number of stone and brick houses also started to increase. The biggest town fire occurred 1869, when out of a population of around 10,000 approximately 8,000 
inhabitants lost their homes, and about 350 farms were destroyed. Almost the whole town north of Gavleån was burnt down. All the buildings south of Gavleån were saved. An area of the old town between the museum and the library has been preserved to this day as a historic reserve, Gamla Gefle.

After the catastrophe of the fire Gävle developed its characteristic grid plan with large esplanades and green areas. It is now a green town with wide avenues. Stopping the spread of future town fires was the main idea behind this development.

An extensive redevelopment of the central town area was started during the 1950s. Around 1970 Gävle became a large urban district when it was united with the nearby municipalities of Valbo, Hamrånge, Hedesunda, and Hille. New suburbs like Stigslund, Sätra, Andersberg, and Bomhus have grown up around the central city.

In the middle of the 1800s to the beginning of the 1900s, there was a bad harvest and a high unemployment rate in Sweden. At the same time, political and religious oppression occurred, and religious encounters outside the State Church were not allowed. This led many Swedes to emigrate to other countries such as the United States. During the early emigration era, Gävle was one of the cities from which people left on their journey to the US. People from parts of Gästrikland and other neighboring counties made their way to the harbor town of Gävle and then commenced their departure to America.

In 1986 as a result of the Chernobyl disaster, Gävle was subjected to a severe deposition of radionuclides, exceeding 185 kBq per square meter. The impact was much greater than experienced by other regions of western Europe and as such, Gävle became one of the most affected areas outside of the Soviet Union.  
Between 1905 and 1997, the I14 Regiment was located in Gävle.

Gävle was the birthplace of the botanist Erik Acharius (1757).

Geography

Gävle is situated by the Baltic Sea near the mouth of the river Dalälven. At 60 degrees north and 17 degrees east, Gävle has the same latitude as Helsinki and the same longitude as Vienna and Cape Town. Bordering municipalities are Söderhamn, Ockelbo, Sandviken, Heby, Tierp and Älvkarleby. Twenty kilometers west of Gävle lies Sandviken.

Climate
Gävle has a similar climate to the rest of central Sweden with winter highs just below freezing and summer highs a bit above . Under the Köppen climate classification Gävle is classified as humid continental (Dfb), in spite of the significant maritime influence. It is also one of the northernmost cities of significant size in the world with this climate type, since areas north of the 60th latitude for the most part are dominated by various subarctic climate types.

While precipitation usually is moderate, in August 2021, Gävle was hit by a Flash flood after recording  of rainfall in one day. Considerable flooding occurred in multiple regions with entire neighborhoods flooded. Vehicles were submerged and landslides occurred as well. At least 10 heavy rain reports were reported.

Economy

Trade from the port of Gävle increased markedly during the 15th century when copper and iron began to be exported from the port. In order to ensure that all trade was via Stockholm, sailing to foreign ports from Gävle and a few other ports was forbidden.

During the 16th century, Gävle was one of the most important port and merchant towns with many shipping companies and shipyards.

In 1787 Gävle was awarded "free and unrestricted sailing rights" to and from foreign ports. This led to an increase in trade, which in turn led to an increase in buildings, industrial developments, trade and shipping.

Today there are few shipping companies or shipyards left, but an important port remains. It has over 1000 ships calling per year and is among the top ten common ports in Sweden.

Major companies
 BillerudKorsnäs (pulp and paper industry)
 Kraft General Foods Scandinavia (Gevalia coffee)
 Cale Industri (parking meters)

Demography

Culture
Gävle has, considering its size, a large and well nourished cultural life, being a cradle for many musicians such as The Deer Tracks and The Sound of Arrows. The city applied to become the European Capital of Culture in 2014.

Arts and museums
The prison museum of Sweden, the county museum of Gävleborg, and the national railway museum are the three largest museums in the city. The prison museum is located near Gävle Castle and depicts the history of crime and punishment in Sweden. The county museum (located downtown) hosts an art collection spanning from the 1600s to present time and well as a section dedicated to cultural history. Finally, the Swedish Railway Museum (Rälsgatan 1), hosts a collection that began to accumulate in 1906 in Stockholm and which was moved to Gävle in 1970.

Gävle has a theater dating back to the 1800s. It is still used for performances today, including classic theater, opera, variety and stand-up.

There is also a concert hall in Gävle which was inaugurated in 1998. It is home to the 1912 Gävle Symphony Orchestra, whose principal conductor is Jaime Martín.

Media
Gefle Dagblad founded in 1895 and Arbetarbladet are the two leading media outlets covering Gävle in the papers. Both have a long history dating back to the early 1900s and the late 1800s, respectively. Aside from this, the Swedish national public TV broadcaster, SVT, has an editorial office in the city and the national public radio Sveriges Radio broadcasts from the city.

Sports
Gävle has teams competing in the highest national league in football (Gefle IF) as well as ice hockey (Brynäs IF) and floorball (Gävle GIK).

Å-Draget 
Each September Gävle Kommun organises a weekend where outdoor candles are lit along the banks of the Gavle River in an attempt to highlight its beauty and its importance to the city. The kommun organises different performances and activities for residents and visitors to enjoy as the walk along the river.

Education

The University College of Gävle currently enrolls 16,000 students. It offers over 800 courses and around 50 degree programs in technology, social and natural sciences, and the humanities. Its research profiles are "Built Environment" ("Byggd miljö") and "Health in working life" ("Hälsofrämjande arbetsliv"). Some courses are offered in English and are taken by both international and Swedish students.

Miscellanea
Gävle is known for being the birthplace of the Gevalia coffee brand, which is produced by Kraft General Foods Scandinavia and exported around the globe. Gevalia is particularly popular in the Americas and produces dozens of unique flavored coffees for the United States that are not available to its customers in Europe. However, visitors who come to the factory in Gävle can sample many of the premium blends. (Gevalia is the Latin name for Gävle).

Other brands from Gävle include the throat lozenges Läkerol and the car-shaped sweets Ahlgrens Bilar.

Gävle preserves the memory of the Swedish-American labor activist and martyr Joel Emmanuel Hägglund, better known as Joe Hill, who was born there in 1879. The Hägglund family home still stands in Gävle at the address Nedre Bergsgatan 28, in Gamla Stan, the Old Town.  it houses a museum and the Joe Hill-gården, which hosts cultural events.

Gävle goat

The history of the Gävle goat began in 1966. Stig Gavlén came up with the idea of placing a giant version of the traditional Swedish Christmas goat of straw in Slottstorget (Castle Square) in central Gävle. On 1 December the 13-metre tall, 7-metre long, 3 tonne goat was erected on the square. At midnight on New Year's Eve, the goat went up in flames. The goat has since had a history of being burnt almost every year, 2005 being the 22nd time it was burnt. Burning the goat is an illegal act and not welcomed by most citizens of Gävle, but undoubtedly this is what has made the goat famous. In 2006 the goat was covered in a flame-resistant coating to prevent arson, enabling the goat to remain standing throughout that winter. On December 27, 2015, the goat was burnt for the 28th time. In its 54-year history, the goat has been burnt down 38 times.

Notable people

 Linn Ahlborg (born 1999) Swedish blogger and influencer
 Siri Andersson-Palmestav (1903–2002) writer and missionary.
 Anna Bartels (1869–1950), opera singer
 Alexandra Dahlström (born 1984) actress and film director.
 Thomas Di Leva (born 1963) singer and songwriter.
John E. Forsgren (1816–1890) the first Mormon missionary to preach in Sweden
 Hans Forssell (1843–1901) historian and political writer.
 Åke Fridell (1919–1985) a film actor.
 Valborg Elisabeth Groning (1890-1970) circus princess
 Joe Hill (1879–1915) labour activist and songwriter
 Rolf Lassgård (born 1955) an actor in crime dramas.
 Regina Lund (born 1967) actress and singer.
 Åke Lundqvist (1936–2021) actor at Stockholm City Theatre
 Yat Malmgren (1916–2002) dancer and acting teacher at the Drama Centre London
 Andreas Rudman (1668–1708), pioneer Swedish American Lutheran minister.
 Rikard Sjöblom (born 1982), musician with Gungfly, Beardfish & Big Big Train.
 Cat Stevens (born 1948) musician; his mother Ingrid Wickman was from Gävle, where he lived during his childhood
 Joakim Sundström (born 1965) sound editor, sound designer and musician
 Erik Wickberg (1904–1996)  former General of The Salvation Army & Chief of the Staff of The Salvation Army
 Lars-Åke Wilhelmsson (born 1958) fashion designer and drag artist.

Sports professionals 
 Nicklas Bäckström (born 1987) ice hockey player for the Washington Capitals
 Christian Edstrom (born 1976) rally co-driver
 Anders Eklund (1957–2010) Olympic heavyweight boxer
 Peppe Femling (born 1992) biathlete and Olympic gold medallist
 Andreas Johnsson (born 1994) ice hockey player for the San Jose Sharks
 Calle Järnkrok (born 1991) ice hockey player for the Toronto Maple Leafs
 Ewa Laurance (born 1964) pool player
 Oskar Lindblom (born 1996) ice hockey player for the San Jose Sharks
 Anders Lindbäck (born 1988)  ice hockey goaltender who has played for several NHL teams
 Elias Lindholm (born 1994) ice hockey player for the Calgary Flames
 Jacob Markström (born 1990) ice hockey player for the Calgary Flames
 Christian Djoos (born 1994) ice hockey player, won Stanley Cup in 2018.
 Felix Sandström (born 1997) ice hockey goaltender for the Philadelphia Flyers
 Jakob Silfverberg (born 1990) ice hockey player for the Anaheim Ducks.

European cooperation
Gävle is a member city of Eurotowns network.

Hospital
Gävle Hospital has approximately 300 physicians, and serves an area of approximately 150.000 people. It has a centre for clinical research in cooperation with Uppsala University.

Twin towns – sister cities
Gävle is twinned with five cities: 
 Jūrmala, Latvia 
 Galva, Illinois, United States
 Næstved, Denmark
 Rauma, Finland
 Gjøvik, Norway

See also
 International Ice Hockey Federation World Championships (1995)
 List of Gävleborg Governors

References
Notes

External links

 Gävle - official site
 

 
County seats in Sweden
Populated places in Gävle Municipality
Municipal seats of Gävleborg County
Gästrikland
Swedish municipal seats
Coastal cities and towns in Sweden
Cities in Gävleborg County